Madame X was a girl group from Bridgeport, Connecticut, which consisted of Iris Parker, Alisa Randolph, and Valerie Victoria. The funk/R&B group was produced by Bernadette Cooper, the drummer of Klymaxx. The band's 1987 release Madame X featured the single "Just That Type of Girl".

References

External links

American contemporary R&B musical groups
American girl groups
Atlantic Records artists